Sioux City Air National Guard Base is an Iowa Air National Guard base, located at Sioux Gateway Airport It is located  south-southeast of Sioux City, Iowa.  On , the airport was named "Colonel Bud Day Field" in honor of United States Air Force Colonel George Everette "Bud" Day, a Sioux City, Iowa native and is the only person ever awarded both the Medal of Honor and the Air Force Cross.

Overview
Sioux Gateway Regional Airport is home for the Iowa Air National Guard's 185th Air Refueling Wing. The wings main mission is to provide mid-air refueling and mobility sustainment in direct support of the global mission of the Air Force. As a community-based organization the wing and its subordinate units are also tasked to support the state of Iowa in the event of a state emergency.

History
The station was established in March 1942 as Sioux City Army Air Base (AAB) and was a major training center during World War II under II Bomber Command for crew members of B-24 Liberators and B-17 Flying Fortresses.  During the 1950s, the airfield was an Air Defense Command fighter-interceptor base.  Beginning in 1956, the ADC flying activity was reduced and Sioux City became an ADC command and control station for Ground Control Intercept (GCI) Radar Stations in the Midwest, later becoming a Direction Center (DC-22) for the ADC Sioux City Air Defense Sector and later the 30th Air Division.  In 1968, ADC closed its facilities with the Iowa Air National Guard becoming the host unit at the base.

World War II

The construction of Sioux City AAB began in March 1942, about three months after the Japanese attack on Pearl Harbor. The base performed primarily Phase III advanced group training, and once completed, the groups were deployed overseas to either the Eighth Air Force (ETO), or Fifteenth Air Force (MTO) for combat operations.

The host unit at the base was the 354th Army Air Force Base Unit, and the major training organization was the 393d Combat Training School (later redesignated 224th Combat Crew Training School in 1944). At its peak, (October 1943) there were 940 officers and 5,183 enlisted men either assigned or attached to the base. The major training activities at Sioux City included aerial gunnery, bombardment, navigation, formation flying, and other related courses.

Initially training at the field was intended to prepare an entire bomb group for overseas combat (OTU – Operational Training). After July 1943, sufficient Bomb Groups had been formed and trained, and the base switched to training individual crews as replacements or additions to various bomb groups (RTU – Replacement Training).  Hollywood actor, pilot and Army Air Force Captain (later Brigadier General) James Stewart was posted to Sioux City with his squadron in 1943, where he and his crew completed their initial B-24 Liberator qualification prior to deployment overseas.

The training of B-17 crews continued until May 1945. Around that time, the field received a new mission which required the conversion of the facilities for B-29 Superfortress training.

The base was transferred to the 17th Bombardment Operational Training Wing and began the transition to start B-29 training. By early June, there were ten B-29's on the field. The new training program was short lived, however because in August 1945 it was canceled. With the end of World War II, the former training base switched to becoming a processing center to discharge personnel out of the service and back into civilian life.

With its mission completed, Sioux City Army Air Base closed in December 1945.

Fighter-Interceptor base
However, the facility would not remain closed for long, as in September 1946 the airfield was opened by the Air Force Reserve.  Sioux City Air Base was one of the first Air Force Reserve bases established after the war, and in December 1946 the 185th Iowa Air National Guard unit was established at Sioux City.

Assigned to the new Air Defense Command (ADC) upon reactivation, the 140th Army Air Force base unit was activated as its host unit. The mission of the 140th AFBU was to offer flight and ground training to all commissioned and enlisted members of the Air Force Reserve residing in Iowa, Minnesota, Nebraska, South Dakota and Wyoming.

During the 1950s, ADC based the 521st Air Defense Group at Sioux City beginning on 15 February 1953 as part of the Central Air Defense Force.  The 521st had the 14th, 87th and 519th Fighter-Interceptor Squadrons, equipped with F-86 Sabres, F-84 Thunderstreaks, and F-102 Delta Daggers.  In 1955, the 521st was reassigned and replaced by the 13th Fighter-Interceptor Squadron, which flew with the 14th FIS from the base until 1960.

ADCOM Radar Control Center
Beginning in 1959, the ADC flying activity was reduced and Sioux City became an ADC command and control base.  The Sioux City Air Defense Sector (SCADS) was established on  assuming control of former ADC Central Air Defense Force units in western Iowa, most of Nebraska along with southern South Dakota.

In 1959, a Semi Automatic Ground Environment (SAGE) Data Center (DC-22) was established at Sioux City AFS. The SAGE system was a network linking Air Force (and later FAA) General Surveillance Radar stations into a centralized center for Air Defense, intended to provide early warning and response for a Soviet nuclear attack. The operation of DC-22 with its AN/FSQ-7 computer was the primary mission of SCADS, as well as providing air defense over parts of Minnesota, Colorado and Wyoming

The 30th AD administered and trained subordinate units, and participated in numerous air defense training exercises. In addition, it supervised training of Air National Guard units with a pertinent mobilization assignment.

DC-22 was inactivated in September 1968 as ADC phased down its interceptor mission as the chances of a Soviet bomber attack on the United States seemed remote, its mission being consolidated into North American Aerospace Defense Command (NORAD).

With the inactivation of the 30th AD, the Air Force closed Sioux City Air Force Station as an active-duty facility.  Its facilities were turned over to Sioux Gateway Airport, along with the Air Force Reserve and Iowa Air National Guard for limited military use.  Today, the Sioux City SAGE building is reportedly now a turkey processing plant.

Iowa Air National Guard

The 185th Air Refueling Wing was established in December 1946. The Army Air Force's 386th Fighter Squadron, flying P-47 Thunderbolts, was activated in 1943 and then inactivated in 1945 at the end of World War II. The unit was subsequently re-designated the 174th Fighter Squadron and allocated to the Iowa National Guard on 24 May 1946.  On , the 174th was extended Federal recognition and equipped with P-51 Mustangs. Today, the 174th is still the flying squadron at the 185th Air Refueling Wing, formerly the 185th Fighter Wing.

For three years, the 174th flew the P-51 Mustang, later redesignated the F-51 "Mustang after the U.S. Air Force became an independent service in 1947 and all Army Air Forces National Guard units became Air National Guard units. In 194950, the unit received its first jet, the F-84B "Thunderjet." Most jet pilots transferred to USAF units in Europe and the Far East. During its Korean service, the squadron was re-equipped with the F-51D . The unit finished their tour and was transferred back to state control on 31 December 1952. In July 1953, the unit converted from F-51Ds to the F-80C Shooting Star.

In 1955, the 174th FS was re-designated the 174th Fighter Interceptor Squadron and was transitioned to the F-84E Thunderstreak as a component of the 132nd Fighter Interceptor Wing.  In 1961, the unit was re-designated the 174th Tactical Fighter Squadron and converted to flying F-100C Super Sabre. On , the unit reached group status and was reorganized and re-designated as the 185th Tactical Fighter Group.

On , the 185th was recalled to active Federal service as a result of the "Pueblo Crisis". The 174th Tactical Fighter Squadron of the 185th augmented by many of the other personnel from the Group, deployed with their F-100s to Phu Cat Air Base, South Vietnam on 11 May 1968. During the course of the next 90 days, the balance of the 185th was deployed to six military bases in Korea and several others within the continental United States.

In 1977, the 185th converted to the A-7D Corsair II.  On , the 185th converted aircraft again, receiving F-16 Fighting Falcons. On 16 March 1992, the 185th Tactical Fighter Group was re-designated the 185th Fighter Group.  As the Air Force and Air Guard standardized unit structures, the 185th was designated the 185th Fighter Wing. The F-16 "Fighting Falcon" would be the last jet that the unit would fly before conversion to the KC-135 Stratotanker aerial refueling aircraft in 2003 and being re-designated the 185th Air Refueling Wing.  In 2007, the 185th began transitioning from the KC-135E to KC-135R and KC-135T models with larger engines, capable of more missions.

UA Flight 232 crash
On , Sioux City IAP / Sioux City ANG was the emergency landing site for United Airlines Flight 232 after a catastrophic failure of the plane's hydraulic system.  The emergency landing happened to coincide with an activation of the base's Air National Guard force, which provided the maximum manpower on the airport including the firefighting forces of the local Air National Guard unit.  The ANG firefighter's were only equipped to handle small commuter and Air Force A-7 aircraft, rather than a widebody jet such as the DC-10.  It is widely recognized that the efforts of the Air Guardsmen at the Sioux City Airport contributed to many lives being saved after the crash of UA 232.

Major units assigned

World War II

 15th Bombardment Training Wing, November 1942July 1943
 393d Bombardment Group, JuneAugust 1943 (OTU); November 1943April 1944 (RTU)
 17th Bombardment Wing, FebruaryDecember 1945
 47th Bombardment Wing, JulyOctober 1945
 99th Bombardment Group, November 1942January 1943 (B-17)
 100th Bombardment Group, December 1942January 1943 (B-17)
 379th Bombardment Group, FebruaryApril 1943 (B-17)
 384th Bombardment Group, AprilMay 1943 (B-17)
 388th Bombardment Group, AprilJune 1943 (B-17)
 445th Bombardment Group, JulyOctober 1943 (B-24)
 448th Bombardment Group, SeptemberNovember 1943 (B-24)
 485th Bombardment Group, JulySeptember 1945 (B-24)

Air Defense Command

 Sioux City Air Defense Sector, 
 Re-designated: 30th Air Division, 
 521st Air Defense Group, 
 Re-designated: 53d Fighter Group (Air Defense), 
 328th Fighter Wing (Air Defense), 
 163d Fighter-Interceptor Squadron,  (Federalized Indiana Air National Guard) (F-51D)
 87th Fighter-Interceptor Squadron,  (F-51D)
 519th Fighter-Interceptor Squadron, 
 Re-designated: 13th Fighter-Interceptor Squadron,  (F-86D)
 14th Fighter-Interceptor Squadron,  (F-86D)

Iowa Air National Guard

 174th Fighter Squadron established 
 Extended federal recognition 
 Re-designated 174th Fighter Interceptor Squadron, 1955
 Re-designated 185th Tactical Fighter Group, 
 Re-designated 185th Fighter Group, 
 Re-designated 185th Fighter Wing, 1992
 Re-designated 185th Air Refueling Wing, 2003

See also

 Iowa World War II Army Airfields
 List of USAF Aerospace Defense Command General Surveillance Radar Stations

References

 
 
 
 185th Air Refueling Wing website

1942 establishments in Iowa
Aerospace Defense Command military installations
Installations of the United States Air National Guard
Military installations established in 1942
Military installations in Iowa
Radar stations of the United States Air Force